Gorelovo may refer to:
Gorelovo Municipal Okrug, a municipal okrug in Krasnoselsky District of the federal city of St. Petersburg, Russia
Gorelovo (air base), a defunct air base in Leningrad Oblast, Russia
Gorelovo (rural locality), several rural localities in Russia